Balu Kiriyath is an Indian Malayalam film lyricist, screenwriter and director.

Early life
He was born on 29 November 1954 in aluva as son of RS Pillai
and CP Malathy Amma.  He was the first district President of ksc(trivandrum) and general secretary of Malayalam Cine Technicians Association (Macta) during 2012. He was also the director of Kerala state Film development corporation for 10 years and served as member secretary of Vilopilly samskrithi Bhavan and director mpcc;  department of culture government of kerala for 4 years.

Personal life
He is married to Lakshmi and the couple have two Children

Filmography

Direction
 Thakilukottaampuram (1981)
 Visa (1983)
 Thathamme Poocha Poocha (1984)
 Onnum Mindaatha Bhaarya (1984)
 Enganeyundashaane (1984)
 Paavam Poornima (1984)
 Nayakan (Vaa Kuruvi Varu Kuruvi) (1985)
 Vendor Daniel State Licency (1994)
 Kalyaanji Aanandji (1995)
 Mimics Action 500 (1995)
 Kalamasseriyil Kalyaanayogam (1995)
 Sulthaan Hyderali (1996)
 King Soloman (1996)
 Moonnu Kodiyum 300 Pavanum (1997)
 Maayaajaalam (1998)

Screenplay
 Thakilukottaampuram (1981)
 Visa (1983)
 Onnum Mindaatha Bhaarya (1984)
 Enganeyundashaane (1984)
 Paavam Poornima (1984)
 Aattakkadha (1987)

Dialogue
 Thakilukottaampuram (1981)
 Visa (1983)
 Onnum Mindaatha Bhaarya (1984)
 Enganeyundashaane (1984)
pavam poornima (1984)
 Aattakkadha (1987)
 Adholokam (1988)

Story
 Onnum Mindaatha Bhaarya (1984)
 Aattakkadha (1987)
 Adholokam (1988)
 Kalamasseriyil Kalyaanayogam (1995)

Art direction
 Nayakan (Vaa Kuruvi Varu Kuruvi) (1985)

References

External links

Malayalam screenwriters
Malayalam film directors
Living people
1954 births